Eric L. Johnson is the Lawrence and Charlotte Hoover Professor of Pastoral Care at Southern Baptist Theological Seminary. He is also Director of the Society for Christian Psychology and associate editor of the Journal of Psychology & Theology. Johnson studied at Toronto Baptist Seminary, Calvin College and Michigan State University, and previously taught at Northwestern College in Minnesota.

References

American Christian theologians
Calvin University alumni
Living people
Michigan State University alumni
Place of birth missing (living people)
Year of birth missing (living people)